Václav Dobiáš (22 September 1909 in Radčice – 18 May 1978 in Prague) was a Czech composer.

Life
Dobiáš was born in Radčice, Bohemia. He studied in Prague with Josef Bohuslav Foerster and then at the Prague Conservatory under Vítězslav Novák. Many of his early works show considerable influence from folk music. Later in his life he became interested in quarter tone composition, especially after studying with Alois Hába. After working in the Czech Ministry of Information, he became professor at the Prague Academy of Music in 1950. Some of his 1940s and 1950s works, especially his cantatas, were written in praise of communism. His work was also part of the music event in the art competition at the 1948 Summer Olympics.

He died in Prague.

Works

Chamber music
String Quartet No. 1 (1931)
Sonata for Violin and Piano (1936)
String Quartet No. 2 (1936)
Říkadla, Nonet (1938)
String Quartet No. 3 (1938)
Sonata for Cello and Piano (1939)
Lento for 3 harps, 1940
String Quartet No. 4 (1942)
Pastorální dechový kvintet, wind quintet (1943)
Ballade for Viola and Piano (1944)
Little Suite for Cello and Piano (1944)
4 Nocturnes for Cello and Piano (1944)
Quartettino for String Quartet (1944)
Dance for Cello and Piano (1946)
Taneční fantasie (Dance Fantasy), Nonet (1948)
O rodné zemí, Nonet (1952)

Other works
Suite for piano (1939)
Concertino for violin (1941)
Stalingrad, cantata (1945)
Sinfonietta (1946)
Slavnostní pochod (1948)
Buduj vlast, posílíš mir (Build Your Country, Strengthen Peace), cantata (1950)
Symphony No. 2 (1956–57)
Festive Overture (1966)

References

Further reading
Don Randel. The Harvard Biographical Dictionary of Music. Harvard, 1996, pp. 217–218.

1909 births
1978 deaths
People from Jablonec nad Nisou District
People from the Kingdom of Bohemia
Members of the Central Committee of the Communist Party of Czechoslovakia
Members of the National Assembly of Czechoslovakia (1960–1964)
Members of the National Assembly of Czechoslovakia (1964–1968)
Members of the Chamber of the People of Czechoslovakia (1969–1971)
20th-century classical composers
Czech choral conductors
Czech classical composers
Czech male classical composers
20th-century conductors (music)
20th-century Czech male musicians
Olympic competitors in art competitions